Natalia Mikhaylovna Goncharova (born January 29, 1988 in Voronezh) is a Russian diver. Competing in the 2004 Summer Olympics, she won a silver medal in the women's synchronized 10 metre platform with teammate Yulia Koltunova. She also competed in the 2008 Summer Olympics.

External links
 
 Page at Cska.ru

Russian female divers
Olympic divers of Russia
Olympic silver medalists for Russia
Divers at the 2004 Summer Olympics
Divers at the 2008 Summer Olympics
1988 births
Living people
Sportspeople from Voronezh
Olympic medalists in diving
Medalists at the 2004 Summer Olympics
Universiade medalists in diving
Universiade silver medalists for Russia
21st-century Russian women